Aldo Angoula (born 4 May 1981) is a French former professional footballer who played as a centre-back.

Career
Born in Le Havre, Angoula began his career at Championnat de France Amateurs side FUSC Bois-Guillaume, in 2007 he joined Ligue 2 side US Boulogne, in December 2008 left the club and moved to Croix de Savoie Gaillard.

Angoula retired at the end of the 2018–19 season.

Personal life
Angoula was born in France to a Cameroonian father. His brother Gaël played from 2005 to 2007 with him by FUSC Bois-Guillaume.

References
 

Living people
1981 births
Footballers from Le Havre
French footballers
Association football defenders
Le Havre AC players
USF Fécamp players
US Boulogne players
Thonon Evian Grand Genève F.C. players
LB Châteauroux players
Ligue 1 players
Ligue 2 players
Championnat National players
Championnat National 3 players
French sportspeople of Cameroonian descent